Icecast is a streaming media project released as free software maintained by the Xiph.Org Foundation. It also refers specifically to the server program which is part of the project. Icecast was created in December 1998/January 1999 by Jack Moffitt and Barath Raghavan to provide an open-source audio streaming server that anyone could modify, use, and tinker with.  Version 2, a ground-up rewrite aimed at multi-format support (initially targeting Ogg Vorbis) and scalability, was started in 2001 and released in January 2004.

History
Icecast was originally developed by Moffitt in 1998 for SMU's radio station. At the time, the station was constantly losing its FCC license and was at the time only able to reach listeners in the same building. Given that all of the dorms throughout campus had Ethernet connectivity, using streaming audio to broadcast was a natural solution, but currently available audio streaming software, such as RealAudio, was too expensive. Moffitt created Icecast, allowing the station to easily reach everwhere on campus without the necessity of FCC licensing or a transmitter upgrade. Initially developed to support mp3's, Vorbis support was added shortly after.

Technical details
The Icecast server is capable of streaming audio content as Opus or Vorbis over standard HTTP, video as WebM or Theora over HTTP, and MP3, AAC, and NSV over the SHOUTcast protocol. Theora, AAC, and NSV are only supported in version 2.2.0 and newer.

Icecast requires external programs, called "source clients", to originate the streams, and the Icecast project includes a source client program known as IceS. The source runs typically in the place where the audio is generated (e.g., a studio) and the Icecast server where a high-bandwidth connection is available (e.g., a colocation centre). Since version 2.4.0 source clients can use plain HTTP standard PUT requests instead of the custom SOURCE method.

Supported file formats

See also

List of streaming media systems
SHOUTcast
Peercasting
Edcast

References

External links 

article in Streaming Media magazine: The Birth of Icecast

Free audio software
Internet radio software
Xiph.Org projects
Streaming software
1999 software